In addition to the drums used as main memory by IBM, e.g., IBM 305, IBM 650, IBM offered drum devices as secondary storage for the 700/7000 series and System/360 series of computers.

IBM 731
The IBM 731 is a discontinued storage unit used on the IBM 701.  It has a storage capacity of 2048 36-bit words (9,216 8-bit bytes).

IBM 732
The IBM 732 is a discontinued storage unit used on the IBM 702. It has a storage capacity of 60,000 6-bit characters (45,000 8-bit bytes).

IBM 733
The IBM 733 is a discontinued storage unit used on the IBM 704 and IBM 709. It has a storage capacity of 8192 36-bit words (36,864 8-bit bytes).

IBM 734
The IBM 734 is a discontinued storage unit used on the IBM 705 It has a storage capacity of 60,000 6-bit characters (45,000 8-bit bytes).

IBM 7320 
The IBM 7320 is a discontinued storage unit manufactured by IBM announced on December 10, 1962 for the IBM 7090 and 7094 computer systems, was retained for the earliest System/360 systems as a count key data device, and was discontinued in 1965. The 7320 is a vertically mounted head-per-track device with 449 tracks, 400 data tracks, 40 alternate tracks, and 9 clock/format tracks. The rotational speed is 3490 rpm, so the average rotational delay is 8.6 milliseconds.

Attachment to a 709x system is through an IBM 7909 Data Channel and an IBM 7631 File Control unit, which can attach up to five random-access storage units, a mix of 7320 and 1301 DASD. One or two 7631 controllers can attach to a computer system, but the system can still attach only a total of five DASD. When used with a 709x, a track holds 2796 six-bit characters, and a 7320 unit holds 1,118,400 characters. Data transfer rate is 202,800 characters per second.

The 7320 attaches to a System/360 through a channel and an 2841 Storage Control unit. Each 2841 can attach up to eight 7320 devices. When used with System/360, a track holds 2081 eight-bit bytes, and a 7320 unit holds 878,000 bytes. Data transfer rate is 135,000 bytes per second.

The 7320 was superseded by the IBM 2301 in mid-1966.

IBM 2301
The IBM 2301 is a magnetic drum storage device introduced in the late 1960s to "provide large capacity, direct access storage for IBM System/360 Models 65, 67, 75, or 85." The vertically mounted drum rotates at around 3500 revolutions per minute, and has a head-per-track access mechanism and a capacity of 4 MB. The 2301 has 800 physical tracks; four physical tracks make up one logical track which is read or written as a unit. The 200 logical tracks have 20,483 bytes each. Average access time is 8.6 msec, and the data transfer rate is 1.2 million bytes per second. The 2301 attaches to a System/360 via a selector channel and an IBM 2820 Storage Control Unit, which can control up to four 2301 units.

IBM 2303
The IBM 2303 is a magnetic drum storage device with the same physical specifications as the IBM 2301. The difference is that the 2303 reads and writes one physical track at a time, rather than the four in the 2301, reducing the data transfer rate to 312.5 thousand bytes per second. The 2303 attaches to System/360 through a channel and an IBM 2841 Storage Control Unit, which can attach up to two 2303 units.

See also
 Drum memory: Drums used as main memory

References

History of computing hardware
7320
Computer storage devices